The National Presidential Band of Ukraine is a Ukrainian military brass band of state that serves as the official musical ensemble of the President of Ukraine.

Description
It was created in accordance with the resolution of the Chairman of the Verkhovna Rada on 29 November 1991. The founder and artistic director was People's Artist of Ukraine Anatoliy Molotay. In June 1992, the band was reorganized and renamed the Exemplary Band of the National Guard of Ukraine. In September 1995, the orchestra was commissioned to provide musical support to the presentation of the Council of Europe Information and Documentation Center in Ukraine. The same year, it conducted a concert tour of Germany. In December, 1997 it was renamed into the Presidential Band of the National Guard. On 14 April 2003, by the decree of President Kuchma, the band was granted the status of being a national unit and was this renamed into the National Presidential Band.

People such as Ivan Karabyts, Anatoliy Solovianenko Yevgen Stankovych, Anatoliy Solovyanenko, the Yavir Quartet, the Choir of the National Opera of Ukraine and many other performers and musical groups collaborated with the band at different times.

References

Ukrainian military bands
Musical groups established in 1991